Danny Potts may refer to:

Dan Potts (footballer) (born 1994), English footballer
Danny Potts, child actor in the 1984 film Greystoke: The Legend of Tarzan, Lord of the Apes